The men's 3 × 1000 metres relay event at the 1969 European Indoor Games was held on 9 March in Belgrade. It was the last time that this relay was contested at the European Indoor Games or Championships.

Results

References

4 × 400 metres relay at the European Athletics Indoor Championships
Relay